Muhammad Tousiq (born 5 January 1995) is a Pakistani field hockey player.

Career

2010
In November, Tousiq was part of the gold medal winning team at the Asian Games in Guangzhou, China.

2011
Tousiq was part of the Pakistan team at the 2011 Men's Hockey Champions Trophy in Auckland where he was the youngest player and goalscorer at age 16.

References

Living people
1995 births
Pakistani male field hockey players
Asian Games gold medalists for Pakistan
Asian Games silver medalists for Pakistan
Asian Games medalists in field hockey
Field hockey players at the 2010 Asian Games
Field hockey players at the 2014 Asian Games
Field hockey players at the 2012 Summer Olympics
Olympic field hockey players of Pakistan
Medalists at the 2010 Asian Games
Medalists at the 2014 Asian Games
21st-century Pakistani people